The Indonesian coelacanth (Latimeria menadoensis, Indonesian: raja laut) is one of two living species of coelacanth, identifiable by its brown color.  It is listed as vulnerable by the IUCN, while the other species, L. chalumnae (West Indian Ocean coelacanth) is listed as critically endangered. Separate populations of the Indonesian coelacanth are found in the waters of north Sulawesi as well as Papua and West Papua.

Discovery

On September 18, 1997, Arnaz and Mark Erdmann, traveling in Indonesia on their honeymoon, saw a strange fish in a market at Manado Tua, on the island of Sulawesi. Mark Erdmann thought it was a gombessa (Comoro coelacanth), although it was brown, not blue.  Erdmann took only a few photographs of the fish before it was sold. After confirming that the discovery was unique, Erdmann returned to Sulawesi in November 1997, interviewing fishermen to look for further examples. In July 1998, a fisherman Om Lameh Sonatham caught a second Indonesian specimen, 1.2 m in length and weighing 29 kg on July 30, 1998, and handed the fish to Erdmann. The fish was barely alive, but it lived for six hours, allowing Erdmann to photographically document its coloration, fin movements and general behavior. The specimen was preserved and donated to the Bogor Zoological Museum, part of the Indonesian Institute of Sciences. Erdmann's discovery was announced in Nature in September 1998.

The fish collected by Erdmann was described in a 1999 issue of Comptes Rendus de l'Académie des sciences Paris by Pouyaud et al. It was given the scientific name Latimeria menadoensis (named after Manado where the specimen was found). The description and its naming were published without the involvement or knowledge of Erdmann, who had been independently conducting research on the specimen at the time. In response to Erdmann's complaints, Pouyaud and two other scientists asserted in a submission to Nature that they had been aware of the new species since 1995, predating the 1997 discovery. However the supplied photographic evidence of the purported earlier specimen, supposedly collected off southwest Java, was recognised as a crude forgery by the editorial team and the claim was never published.

The fish is legally protected through the Minister of Forestry Regulation No. 7/1999. However, it continued to be caught by local fishermen; on November 5, 2014, a fisherman found a specimen in his net, the seventh Indonesian coelacanth found in Indonesian waters since 1998. Eight have been caught as of 2018.

Description
Superficially, the Indonesian coelacanth, known locally as raja laut ("king of the sea"), appears to be the same as those found in the Comoros except that the background coloration of the skin is brownish-gray rather than bluish.  It has the same white mottling pattern as the Comorian coelacanth, but with flecks over the dorsal surface of its body and fins that appear golden due to the reflection of light. It may grow to 1.4 meters long.

DNA analysis has shown that the specimen obtained by Erdmann differed genetically from the Comorian population. In 2005, a molecular study estimated the divergence time between the Indonesian and Comorian coelacanth species to be 30–40 mya.  The two species show a 4.28% overall difference in their nucleotides.

An analysis of a specimen recovered from Waigeo, West Papua in eastern Indonesia indicates that there may be another lineage of the Indonesian coelacanth, and the two lineages may have diverged 13 million years ago. Whether this new lineage represents a subspecies or a new species has yet to be determined.

Habitat
Teams of researchers using submersibles have recorded live sightings of the fish in the waters of Manado Tua and the Talise islands off north Sulawesi as well as in the waters of Biak in Papua. These areas share similar steep rocky topography full of caves, which are the habitat of the fish. These coelacanths live in deep waters of around 150 metres or more, at a temperature between 14 and 18 degrees Celsius.

See also
 West Indian Ocean coelacanth (Latimeria chalumnae)

References

External links
 Indonesian coelacanth on YouTube

Indonesian coelacanth
Endemic fauna of Indonesia
Fish of Indonesia
Celebes Sea
Vulnerable fauna of Asia
Indonesian coelacanth